The Voice of Firestone was a radio and television program of classical music. The show featured leading singers in selections from opera and operetta. Originally titled The Firestone Hour, it was first broadcast on the NBC Radio network on December 3, 1928 and was later also shown on television starting in 1949. The program was last broadcast in 1963.

Radio

The program was sponsored by the Firestone Tire and Rubber Company and aired on the "Blue Network" of NBC Radio on Monday nights at 8:30 p.m. Eastern Standard Time from its 1928 inception. In 1948, The Voice of Firestone was the first commercial radio program to be carried simultaneously on both AM and FM radio stations. Firestone's 25th anniversary program was broadcast November 30, 1953, and it continued to be heard on radio until 1957.

Regular performers on the series included James Melton, Eleanor Steber, Richard Crooks, Rise Stevens, Robert Merrill, Thomas Heyward, Igor Gorin, Nadine Conner, Dorothy Warenskjold, and Thomas L. Thomas, among many others. Hugh James was the announcer.

NBC dropped the program after the June 7, 1954, broadcast, but ABC immediately began to air it beginning with the following week's installment.

Television
Firestone sponsored a related television series, The Voice of Firestone Televues, one of the first television series with programming other than news or sports coverage, and according to researchers of television history, may have been the first regularly scheduled series in U.S. television history broadcast beyond New York on a network of multiple stations. It began on November 29, 1943 on New York's WNBT, when there were only a few thousand sets in existence. First seen on the rudimentary NBC television network in April 1944 (New York, Schenectady and Philadelphia), it continued until January 1947 with special interest topics in a documentary film format. The Voice of Firestone radio-TV programs were known not only for classical music, but for their support of organizations such as 4-H and the United Nations.

When The Voice of Firestone arrived on television in the fall of 1949, NBC simulcast the show on radio and TV, one of the first programs to use that technology. Thanks to the appearance on the show of famous classical-music soloists, some from the New York Metropolitan Opera, along with Broadway musical stars, the show was considered quite prestigious, but the ratings always remained low. In an era when successful programs were capable of garnering as many as half the viewers available in a given time slot, The Voice of Firestone typically only had three million viewers, a comparatively small number for what was rapidly becoming the nation's most influential mass medium. In 1954, NBC asked Firestone's permission to move the program to a different night or time period. Firestone refused and NBC canceled the program which then moved to ABC. 

The program continued to air at 8:30 on Mondays until 1959, when ABC insisted on moving the show to a later time period. Firestone refused, and the show was canceled entirely. Although the ratings were low at the time of its cancellation, the fan outcry was loud, with some writing their congressmen. ABC tried to appease the fans with Music for a Summer Night, a copy of the show minus Firestone, but the results were not favorable. The 30th anniversary show was telecast November 24, 1958.

In 1962, The Voice of Firestone returned, airing at 10pm on Sunday nights. The same relatively small number of viewers tuned in, and the show was permanently canceled in May 1963.

The Firestone Orchestra was conducted by Hugo Mariani (1928–31), William Daly (1931–36), Alfred Wallenstein (1936–43) and Howard Barlow (1943 on). Featured among the eight regular singers of the Firestone Chorus were Lorraine Donahue, William Toole (baritone), Russell Hammar (tenor), Donald Craig (bass), and Bill Metcalf.  Hugh James was the announcer.

Cast
 Howard Barlow as Conductor
 Mary Costa as Marguerite

Theme songs
Idabelle Firestone (Mrs. Harvey Firestone) was the composer and lyricist of the program's opening and closing theme songs. She wrote "In My Garden" in 1933 which became the Firestone Hour's opening theme until 1940. In that year "In My Garden" was banned from use by ASCAP due to a composers' dispute. Mrs. Firestone then introduced the popular "If I Could Tell You" which became the show's opening theme song for all its remaining years. "In My Garden" became the closing theme later when the dispute was resolved. Tenor Richard Crooks, the longtime host of the radio broadcasts (from 1928 to 1945), recorded "If I Could Tell You" for RCA Victor. Soprano Eleanor Steber, a frequent Firestone host following Crooks, also recorded both of Idabelle Firestone's songs.

New England Conservatory holdings
The New England Conservatory houses documents and recordings related to The Voice of Firestone.

Notes

References

External links 

Museum of Broadcast Communications: The Voice of Firestone

1920s American radio programs
1930s American radio programs
1940s American radio programs
1950s American radio programs
1950s American television series
1943 American television series debuts
1947 American television series endings
1949 American television series debuts
1963 American television series endings
American Broadcasting Company original programming
American classical music radio programs
Black-and-white American television shows
Bridgestone
NBC original programming
Peabody Award-winning radio programs
Peabody Award-winning television programs
1928 radio programme debuts
1957 radio programme endings
NBC radio programs
ABC radio programs